Events from the year 1730 in Sweden

Incumbents
 Monarch – Frederick I

Events

 23 March - Personal union between Sweden and Landgraviate of Hesse-Kassel until 1751. 
 The first issue of the paper Sedo-lärande Mercurius.

Births

 - Peter Jonas Bergius, medical doctor and botanist (died 1790) 
 
 - Dorothea Maria Lösch, sea captain and war heroine  (died 1799)
 - Helena Ehrenmalm, landowner  (died 1784)

Deaths

 
 14 September – Sophia Elisabet Brenner, poet (born 1659)

References

External links

 
Years of the 18th century in Sweden
Sweden